James "Flex" Lewis (born 15 November 1983) is a former Welsh bodybuilder and has won 7 consecutive 212 Mr. Olympia titles. 
On 12 May 2022 he announced his retirement from competitive bodybuilding. He lives in Las Vegas, Nevada.

Early life
Lewis' interest in bodybuilding began at the age of 12 after discovering a book on Tom Platz. It was Platz's legs, he claims, that inspired Lewis to join a gym and start bodybuilding. Arnold Schwarzenegger was one of Lewis' biggest idols as a child.

One day, when Lewis was home alone, he had scouted his father's shed and came across plastic weights, that his parents wouldn't allow him to use. Despite his parents' prohibition, Lewis would take the weights and hide them under his bed, performing various exercises every night with them, before his parents found out and took them back. This was his introduction to weight training.

At the age of 15 Lewis stepped into a gym for the first time. He had played rugby at a high school level and he needed to gain some size for the sport. After coming across a local bodybuilder by the name of Steve Naylor, he was told that his physique had great potential. He took heed in the advice and trained with Naylor for a year, before he entered his first bodybuilding competition, the Junior Mr. Wales, which he promptly won.

Lewis had a tattoo printed on his left arm at the age of 15, which he claims had stretched and morphed itself completely around his arm as they grew in size. Rugby also introduced Flex to weight training for increasing super power and he consequently has the  ability to  lift an  enormous  weight and hold it  for long  periods of  time.

Contest history
2018 Mr. Olympia Weekend Bodybuilding: IFBB Pro 212 1st Place

2017 Mr. Olympia Weekend Bodybuilding:IFBB Pro 212 1st Place

2016 Mr. Olympia Weekend Bodybuilding: IFBB Pro 212 1st Place

2015 Mr. Olympia Weekend Bodybuilding: IFBB Pro 212 1st Place

2015 IFBB Pro 212 1st Place

2014 IFBB San Marino Pro: IFBB Pro 212 1st Place

2014 EVL's Prague Pro
212 Bodybuilding: IFBB Pro 212
1st Place

2014 IFBB Korea Grand Prix 212: IFBB Pro 212 1st Place

2014 Mr. Olympia Weekend Bodybuilding: IFBB Pro 212 1st Place

2014 IFBB Arnold sports Festival: IFBB Pro 212
1st Place

2013 EVL's Prague Pro
212 Bodybuilding: IFBB Pro 212
1st Place
 
2013 Mr. Olympia Weekend
Bodybuilding: IFBB Pro 212
1st Place
 
2012 EVL's Prague Pro
212 Bodybuilding: IFBB Pro 212
1st Place
 
2012 British Grand Prix
212 Bodybuilding: IFBB Pro 212
1st Place
 
2012 Mr. Olympia Weekend
Bodybuilding: IFBB Pro 212
1st Place

2011 Arnold Classic Europe
Mens Bodybuilding: Pro Men
5th Place

2011 Mr. Olympia Weekend
Men 202: Open
2nd Place

2011 New York Pro Championships
Men's 202: Men's 202 Class
2nd Place
 
2011 Mr. Europe Grand Prix
Men's Open: Men's Open Lis
3rd Place
 
2011 IFBB British Grand Prix
Men's 202: Men's 202 List
1st Place
 
2009 IFBB Atlantic City Pro
202 Division 
1st Place
 
2009 IFBB 202 Challenge (Mr. Olympia)
202 Division 
5th Place
 
2008 Europa Pro
Overall Division
7th Place
 
2008 Europa Pro
202 Division 
1st Place
 
2008 Tampa Pro
Open Division 
7th Place
 
Amateur Competition History: 
2007 British Nationals (Earned Pro Card)
Overall Division 
1st Place
 
2006 Mr. Wales
U90, Overall U90 Division 
1st Place
 
2006 Mr. Britain
U90 Division 
1st Place
 
2004 Nabba Mr. Universe
1st Place
 
2004 EFBB Jr. Mr. Britain
1st Place
 
2004 EFBB Jr. Mr. Wales
1st Place
 
2004 Nabba Mr. Europe
1st Place
 
2004 Nabba Jr. Mr. Britain
1st Place
 
2004 Nabba Mr. Wales
1st Place

2003 EFBB Jr. Mr. Britain
1st Place

2003 EFBB Novice Mr. Wales
1st Place

2003 EFBB Jr. Mr. Wales
1st Place

Awards and honors

At the 2014 Arnold Classic he became the first man to be presented as winner of the 212 class. In 2011, Lewis placed third in the IFBB Mr. Europe pro mens. He holds the record of holding the most 212 class wins at the Mr. Olympia with 7 total wins.

References

External links

FLEXOnline

1983 births
Living people
American bodybuilders
Sportspeople from Llanelli
Professional bodybuilders
Welsh bodybuilders
People from Parkland, Florida